Szilasliget is a town in Hungary, near Budapest. It was founded by Ede Wéber in 1910. Its original name was Helvécia-telep. It has had its own train station. There is the source of the Szilas-brook, which connects to the Danube.

Populated places in Hungary